

Guamblin Island, also known as Socorro Island, Nuestra Señora del Socorro or Huamblin, is a Chilean island. The island is a National Park, and listed as an Important Bird Area.  It is a breeding ground of the sooty shearwater.  

The island is never inhabited, but there were a few desperate men who died on the island in 1725. The island had a different name: Isla de Nuestra Señora del Socorro. In 1724 the Commercie Compagnie (Dutch trading company) equipped two frigates. The expedition was in fact illegal: Spain had the exclusive right to trade with that part of South America. To reduce the danger of being detained by Spanish ships, the frigates were given Spanish-sounding names: Don Carlos and Don Louis. There would also have been Spanish flags on board. In defense against enemy attacks, the ships each had 34 guns.

Both had about 120 men on board. The officers all came from Zeeland, most NCOs and craftsmen came from Zeeland or the rest of the Republic, but the ordinary sailors and soldiers came mostly from Germany or Scandinavia.

Laurens Wartels was one of the crew of the Don Louis. His first name was written on the muster-roll as "Laurus". He held the position of steward.

On the night of January 31 to February 1, 1725, when the ships were at 48 degrees south latitude, a great crackling could be heard on the Don Louis. The main mast was torn. On May 15, Hubregt Kempe noted that the ship was so leaky that it could hardly be kept dry with one pump.

There was a great need for food and drink. So they started searching for land, and an island came into view. Based on old maps, the mates assumed that it was the island of Nuestra Señora del Socorro. That assumption was correct. The island is now called Isla Guamblin. As far as the sailors could tell, no people lived on the island.

The steward Laurens Wartels and two sailors suggested that they stay on the island that night instead of going back to the ship. They could then collect some food the next morning and prepare it for the sick. The captain agreed. He left some supplies for them in case it would not be possible to make the crossing from the ship in the following days. In the following days, however, a severe storm arose that prevented the ship's sloop from reaching the island. In addition, almost all anchor ropes broke, with the result that the ship only had one anchor left. The north wind drifted the ship to the south, getting close to the coast and threatening to hit the rocks.

They arrived at the island on October 26. They saw that the large tent for the sick that the crew had built there on May 30 was toppled, but there was now a smaller tent that they could assume had been built by the three men who stayed behind. However, when they came ashore and walked to the small tent, they saw the three men lying dead in it. They had apparently died of hunger and cold some time ago.

So despite the fact that the island has never been inhabited, three people were buried anyway.

The complete story of the Don Louis can be found on a Dutch website: https://beijen.net/pla/LaurensWartels20200730.pdf,  (by Laurens Beijen, July 30, 2020, in Dutch language)

Oil spill
In June 1973, the Liberian oil tanker Napier ran aground on the island and caused an oil spill releasing 30,000 tons of oil. After the rescue of the crew, Napier was fired upon and set ablaze by Chilean Hawker Hunters with the purpose of burning the oil to avoid further pollution.

See also
 List of islands of Chile
 Cabo Tamar oil spill
 VLCC Metula oil spill

References

External links
 Islands of Chile @ United Nations Environment Programme
 World island information @ WorldIslandInfo.com
 South America Island High Points above 1000 meters
 United States Hydrographic Office, South America Pilot (1916)

Important Bird Areas of Chile
Chonos Archipelago
Protected areas of Aysén Region
National parks of Chile
Environment of Chile
Oil spills in Chile
Islands of Aysén Region
Important Bird Areas of Oceania
Seabird colonies
South American sea lion colonies
Uninhabited islands of Chile